Aku is a given name, a Finnish version of the name Augustus. Notable people with the name include:

Aku Hirviniemi, Finnish actor
August "Aku" Kiuru, Finnish cross-country skier and Olympic medalist
Aku Korhonen, Finnish actor
Aku Louhimies, Finnish film director and screenwriter
Aku Päiviö, Finnish Canadian journalist, poet and socialist

Fictional characters
Aku Ankka, (Finnish for Donald Duck), a Finnish weekly Disney comics magazine
Aku, the main antagonist of the whole Samurai Jack series

Finnish masculine given names
Informal personal names